Lyn Lifshin or Lyn Diane Lipman (July 12, 1942 – December 9, 2019) was an American poet and teacher. Lifshin was “one of the early feminist poets" and one of the most widely published contemporary poets. Her work was autobiographical and explored sexuality, war, and a woman's role in society.

Early life
Born in Burlington, Vermont as Lyn Diane Lipmam and was raised in Middlebury, Vermont. Her father was from Boston and she visited the area frequently as a child. She was Jewish.

She earned a BA in English from Syracuse University in 1961 and a MA in English from the University of Vermont in 1963. She enrolled in a doctoral program in English at State University of New York at Albany from 1964 to 1966 where she was also a teaching fellow. She also studied at Brandeis University and the Bread Loaf School of English.

Career 
While at SUNY Albany, she began submitting her poems for publication. She was first published in 1967 in Kauri, the anti-war mimeo magazine. Her poetry was influenced by the Beat Poets, Sylvia Plath, and Anne Sexton. Her poems feature incomplete sentences, pauses, short lines, sudden revelations, and "a breathless quality". Most of her poems are shorter than thirty lines. She tended to write many poems on the same subject rather than reworking a single poem. 

She taught at the State University of New York at Cobleskill in 1970 and at Empire State College in 1973. She was a poet-in-residence at Mansfield State College in 1974, the University of Rochester in 1986, the Antioch Writers Conference in 1987, and Colorado Mountain College in 1994 and 1998. She taught at Union College from 1980 to 1985. She also taught creative writing workshops at various public venues such as libraries and her home in Niskayuna, New York. 

Lifshin has been called "The Queen of the Small Presses". She was a very prolific poet, publishing over 130 books and chapbooks. Her work appeared in numerous literary magazines and cultural publications, including The American Poetry Review, The American Scholar, Christian Science Monitor, The Georgia Review, Ploughshares, Dunes Review, Rolling Stone Magazine, and Yankee. She also edited anthologies, appeared in others, and was the subject of the documentary film Lyn Lifshin: Not Made of Glass by director Mary Ann Lynch.

Lifshin received numerous fellowships, including the Yaddo Fellowship (1970, 1971, 1975, 1979, and 1980), the MacDowell Fellowship (1973), and the Millay Colony Fellowship (1975 and 1979). She won the Creative Artists Public Service Award in 1976, the Hart Crane Award, Cherry Valley Edition Jack Kerouac Award for Kiss the Skin Off in 1984, and the Madelin Sadin Award in 1989. The Albany Public Library Foundation named her a Literary Legend.

Personal life 
She married Eric Lifshin in 1966. She withdrew from Brandis University after getting married. They moved to Schenectady, New York in the 1970s where he worked for General Electric. They divorced in 1978.

Later in life, she divided her time between a home in Niskayuna, New York and a residence in Vienna, Virginia. She died in 2019  in Vienna after an illness and a fall.

Selected publications

Poetry 
Black Apples. Trumansburg, New York: Crossing Press, 1971. 
The Old House on the Croton. San Lorenzo, California: Shameless Hussy Press, 1973. 
Shaker House Poems.2nd edition. Chatham, New York: Sagarin Press, 1976. 
Upstate Madonna: Poems 1970–1974. Trumansburg, New York: Crossing Press, 1974. 
Old House Poems (Capra Chapbook Series #28). Santa Barbara, California: Capra Press, 1975. 
Naked Charm. Madison, Wisconsin: Fireweed Press, 1976. 
Paper Apples. Stockton, California: Wormwood, 1976. 
Leaning South. New York: Red Dust, 1977, 7
Offered by Owner: A Collection of Lyn Lifshin Poems. Cambridge, New York: Natalie Slohm, 1978. 
Poems. with John Elsberg. Filey, Yorkshire: Fiasco, 1978, 
35 Sundays. Chicago: Ommation Press, 1979. 
Blue Dust, New Mexico. Fredonia, New York: Basilisk Press, 1982. 
Madonna Who Shifts for Herself. Long Beach, California: Applezaba, 1983. 
Kiss the Skin Off. New York: Cherry Valley Editions, 1985. 
Remember the Ladies. East Lansing, Michigan: Ghost Dance Press, 1985. 
Vergin' Mary and Madonna. with Belinda Subraman. Paso, Texas: Vergin Press, 1986. 
Raw Opals. Los Angeles: Illuminati Press, 1987. 
Red Hair and the Jesuit. Parkdale, Oregon: Trout Creek Press, 1987. 
The Doctor Poems. Los Angeles: Applezaba, 1988. 
Eye of the Beast. Vergin Press, 1988. 
Many Madonnas: Poems. St. John, Kansas: Kindred Spirit Press, 1988. 
Rubbed Silk. Los Angeles: Illuminati Press, 1988. 
Dance Poems. Chicago: Ommation Press, 1990. 
Not Made of Glass: Poems, 1968-1988. Saratoga Springs, New York: Karista, 1990. 
Marilyn Monroe: Poems. Portland, Oregon: Quiet Lion, 1994. 
Parade. Stockton, California: Wormwood Review, 1994. 
Blue Tattoo: Poems of the Holocaust. Desert Hot Springs, California: Event Horizon Press, 1995. 
The Mad Girl Drives in a Daze. Long Beach: JVC Books, 1995. 
New Point Shoes. Long Beach: JVC Books, 1995. 
Cold Comfort: Selected Poems, 1970–1996. Santa Rosa, California: Black Sparrow Press, 1997. 
Jesus Christ Live and in the Flesh. Portland, Oregon: Future Tense Books, 1997. 
Restrooms, Anyone?. Long Beach: JVC Books, 1997. 
Before It's Light: New Poems. Santa Rosa, California: Black Sparrow Press, 1999. 
A New Film About A Woman in Love with the Dead. Greensboro, North Carolina: March Street Press, 2003. g
Barbie Poems I. San Pedro: Lummox Press, 2005. 
Barbie Poems II. San Pedro: Lummox Press, 2005. 
The Licorice Daughter: My Year with Ruffian. Huntsville, Texas: Texas Review Press, 2005. 
Out of Line: Imaginative Writings on Peace and Justice. London: Garden House Press, 2005. 
Another Woman Who Looks Like Me: Poems. Santa Rosa, California: Black Sparrow Press, 2006. 
In Mirrors. Rockford. Michigan: Presa Press, 2006. 
92 Rapple Drive. Coatlism Press, 2008, 
Desire. Huntington Beach, California: World Parade Books, 2008. 
Light at the End: The Jesus Poems. Rochester: Clevis Hook Press, 2008. 
Lost in the Fog. Georgetown, Kentucky: Finishing Line Press, 2008, 
Nutley Pond. Waldoboro, Maine: Goose River Press, 2008. 
Persephone. Pasadena, California: Red Hen Press, 2008. 
Ballet Madonnas: Poems. Alpharetta, Georgia: Alpharetta, GAShoe Music Press, 2009. 
Barbaro: Beyond Brokenness. Huntsville, Texas: Texas Review Press, 2009, 
Ballroom: Poems. Greensboro, North Carolina: March Street Press, 2010. 
Katrina. Lake Isabella, California: Poetic Matrix Press, 2010, 
Knife Edge & Absinthe – The Tango Poems. Cleveland: NightBallet Press, 2012. 
A Girl Goes into the Woods. Beacon, New York: NYQ Books, 2013. 
When a Cat Dies. Oklahoma City: Smashwords Edition, 2014. 
Femme Eterna. Glenview, Illinois: Glass Lyre Press, 2014. 
Malala. Lake Isabella, California: Poetic Matrix Press, 2014. 
Secretariat: The Red Freak, The Miracle. Huntsville, Texas: Texas Review Press, 2014. 
Moving Thru Stained Glass: The Maple Poems. Cleveland: NightBallet Press, 2015. 
Little Dancer: The Degas Poems. Cleveland: NightBallet Press, 2015. 
#AliveLikeALoadedGun. Houston: Transcendent Zero Press, 2016. 
Barbaro: Beyond Brokenness. Huntsville, Texas: Texas Review Press, 2022.

Anthologies 

 Six Poets. Newtown, Australia: Vagabond Press, 1979. 
 Mondo Marilyn: A Collection of Stories and Poems about Marilyn. New York: St. Martin's Press, 1995. 
 In the Arms of Words: Poems for Disaster Relief. Sherman Aster Publishing, 2006. 
 Lyrotica: An Anthology of Erotic Poetry and Prose. Apollo Beach, Florida: Vagabondage Press, 2011.  
 Big Pulp: We Honor Those Who Serve. Exter Press, 2012. 
 Buzzkill: Apocalypse - An End of the World Anthology. Cleveland: NightBallet Press, 2012. 
 Written on Water. Bay City, Michigan: Mayapple Press, 2013. 
 Oct Tongue 2. Cleveland: Crisis Chronicles Press, 2017.

Editor 

 Tangled Vines: A Collection of Mother and Daughter Poems. Boston: Beacon Press, 1978. 
 Ariadne's Thread: A Collection of Contemporary Women's Journals. New York, Harper and Row, 1982. 
 Lips Unsealed: Confidences from Contemporary Women Writers. Santa Barbara, California. Capra Press, 1990. 
 Mondo Barbie: An Anthology of Fiction & Poetry. New York: St. Martin's Press, 1993. 
 All The Poets Who Have Touched Me. Huntington Beach, California: World Parade Books, 2010.

More information 

 Fox, Hugh. Lyn Lifshin: A Critical Study. Albany: Whitston Publishing Company, 1985.

References

External links
 Audio Files of Lyn Lifshin reading her poems
 Five Poems by Lyn Lifshin in Peacock Journal
 Poems by Lyn Lifshin on The Sun Magazine

1942 births
2019 deaths
People from Barre, Vermont
Syracuse University alumni
University of Vermont alumni
University at Albany, SUNY alumni
Empire State College faculty
Mansfield University of Pennsylvania faculty
American women poets
20th-century American poets
21st-century American poets
American educators
Poets from New York (state)
Poets from Virginia
American feminist writers
Poets from Vermont
American book editors
People from Burlington, Vermont
Union College (New York) faculty